Mulgowie is a rural locality in the Lockyer Valley Region, Queensland, Australia.

History 
The locality is named after Mount Mulgowie, which in turn has an Aboriginal name meaning big round hill.

Burnside State School opened on 22 January 1877. In 1919 it was renamed Mulgowie State School. It closed on 12 December 1997. It was on Mulgowie School Road.

Education 
There are no schools in Mulgowie. The nearest government primary schools are Thornton State School in neighbouring Thornton to the south and Laidley District State School in Laidley to the north. The nearest government secondary school is Laidley State High School in Laidley.

References 

Lockyer Valley Region
Localities in Queensland